David Tutt is a British politician who is currently the leader of Eastbourne Borough Council and the leader of the Liberal Democrat group on East Sussex County Council.

Political offices

East Sussex County Council 
Tutt is an elected representative of the people of St. Anthony's Division, at East Sussex County Council. Before the creation of that ward, he was first elected to represent the Priory ward in the same area, in 1981.

He is currently in his tenth term as a County Councillor for that locale in Eastbourne, having served in office for 38 years. This is an exceptionally long time, judged against average terms of office for East Sussex County Council and similar tiers of elected government.

Eastbourne Borough Council 
Tutt was first elected to Eastbourne Borough Council, for St. Anthony's Ward, on 1 May 1980. He was appointed leader of the council in May 2007, following elections at which the Liberal Democrats regained control of the council from the Conservatives. As at 2022 he remains leader of the council. and the Chair of its executive Cabinet.

In 2019, he was re-elected as a councillor with a total of 1,604 votes, from a total electorate in St Anthony's Ward of 8,509 registered voters.

Redevelopment of Eastbourne

As Leader of Eastbourne Borough Council, David Tutt has been the lead democratic official overseeing the redevelopment of the town of Eastbourne. A number of projects have been undertaken in an attempt to regenerate the local economy and tax base, or to make profit-generating investments in the town to remodel the Council's income away from reliance on central government block grants.

Devonshire Quarter scheme 

In June 2017, Tutt attended the official opening of a two-storey player's village building, for tennis players at Eastbourne's Devonshire Park tennis grounds. The grounds are host to an annual international tennis tournament. Local council taxes and the Lawn Tennis Association jointly funded the construction of the building, at the direction of Eastbourne Borough Council led by Tutt.

Steve Cresswell, a director of contractors Kier, said of the redevelopment project: "This fantastic project, delivered through the Scape Minor Works framework, will play a key role in the wider £44m (note, officially £54) Devonshire Quarter scheme to provide a top quality sporting, cultural and conference destination in Eastbourne."

Tutt said at the official opening: "The development marks a major part of our work with the LTA to improve the tennis offer here, alongside the £44million transformation underway to put Devonshire Quarter on the map as a first-rate international sporting, cultural and conference destination."

References 

Year of birth missing (living people)
Living people
People from Eastbourne (district)
Members of East Sussex County Council
Liberal Democrats (UK) councillors
Leaders of local authorities of England